Uğur Dündar (born 28 August 1943) is a Turkish journalist, anchorman, political commentator, and writer.

He was born in Akören village of Silivri district in Istanbul Province. He graduated from Istanbul University's Institute of Journalism. He joined Turkish Radio and Television Corporation in 1970 and built a journalistic career over more than 20 years. Until 2011 Dündar was the anchorman of Star TV where he headed the news team.

Currently, he is writing for Sözcü and has a program on Halk TV.

He is chairman of the high council of Fenerbahçe SK since 9th April 2022  and also was board member between 20 February 2000 – 3 March 2002.

Biography
 Haramzade (1995, with Haluk Şahin)
 Haramzadenin Dönüşü (2006, with Haluk Şahin)
 İşte Hayatım, Uğur Dündar (2010, with Nedim Şener), Doğan Kitapçılık
 İyi Uykular Sayın Seyirciler (2012)
 Yalandan Kim Ölmüş, (2013, with Orhan Baykal)
 Pazarlık Yok (2015)
 Vah Ülkem Vah (2016)
 Ya Atatürk Olmasaydı (2017)
 O Halde Biz Anlatalım (2018)

References

External links 
Uğur Dündar's Arena News
A biography of Uğur Dündar
https://twitter.com/ugurdundarsozcu

1943 births
Living people
People from Silivri
Turkish journalists
Turkish writers
Turkish television news anchors
Turkish secularists
Sözcü people
Fenerbahçe S.K. board members
Istanbul University alumni
Vefa High School alumni